Patrick Joseph Barlow (17 May 1914 – 11 March 1986) was an Irish professional footballer, who played professionally for Newry Town, Huddersfield Town, Sligo Rovers, Dundalk and Limerick. He was born in Athlone, Ireland in 1914 and died in Dublin in 1986.

References

1914 births
1986 deaths
People from Athlone
Sportspeople from County Westmeath
Republic of Ireland association footballers
Association football midfielders
English Football League players
Athlone Town A.F.C. players
Huddersfield Town A.F.C. players
Sligo Rovers F.C. players
Dundalk F.C. players
Limerick F.C. players
Chelmsford City F.C. players
Wisbech Town F.C. players